Henry Leroy Hess (October 12, 1890 – March 15, 1974) was an American lawyer and politician from Oregon.

Biography
Hess was born in 1890 in Rexburg, Idaho.

A Democrat, Hess served a term in the Oregon State Senate from 1933 until 1937, representing Union and Wallowa counties. In 1938, he ran for Governor of Oregon. In the Democratic primary, he ran against incumbent Governor Charles Martin, as well as state representative O. Henry Oleen. Harold L. Ickes, Roosevelt's Secretary of the Interior and a key implementer of New Deal policies, indicated his support for Hess, though Roosevelt himself stayed officially neutral. He defeated Martin and Oleen with 49% of the vote. In the general election, Hess lost to Republican candidate Charles A. Sprague with 43% of the vote.

Following his defeat, Hess served as U.S. Attorney for the United States District Court for the District of Oregon from 1945 until 1954. He was also a delegate to the 1944 Democratic National Convention.

Hess married Madeline Mae Owsley (1911–2003) on March 30, 1964, in Stevenson, Washington. He had a son, Henry L. Hess Jr., from a different relationship.

Hess died on March 15, 1974, in Washington County, Oregon.

References

1890 births
1974 deaths
Democratic Party Oregon state senators
United States Attorneys for the District of Oregon
People from La Grande, Oregon
People from Rexburg, Idaho
20th-century American politicians